Tarsus is a city in Cilicia, a region in southeastern Asia Minor (modern Turkey). The city came under Roman rule since 67 BC, until the mid-7th century, when following the Muslim conquest of the Levant control was disputed with the nascent caliphate. During the conflicts between the Byzantines and the Umayyad Caliphate, the city lay in the disputed no-man's-land between the two empires and changed hands frequently, becoming deserted and ruined in the process. In 778/9 the Abbasids undertook the first attempt to restore the city as a base of operations against Byzantium, but the work was apparently not completed. It was not until 787/8 that the city was rebuilt and resettled by Faraj ibn Sulaym al-Khadim, on the orders of Caliph Harun al-Rashid. 3,000 Khurasanis and 2,000 Syrians (a thousand each from Antioch and al-Massisa) were given houses and land in the new fortress city.

Tarsus was apparently recovered by the Byzantines soon after, at some point around the turn of the century. The city probably remained in Byzantine hands during the Abbasid civil war of the Fourth Fitna, but had returned to Muslim control by 830, when Caliph al-Ma'mun recommenced offensive campaigns against Byzantium. The governors of Tarsus often also exercised the governorship of the entire Syrian marches, and their main duty was organizing the annual raids against the Byzantines. The city remained under direct Abbasid control until 878/9, when it and the marches with Byzantium passed to the autonomous ruler of Egypt, Ahmad ibn Tulun. The governor Yazaman al-Khadim returned the city to Abbasid allegiance from 882 on, but was forced to recognize Tulunid overlordship again in 890. Tulunid possession of the  lasted until the death of Ibn Tulun's heir, Khumarawayh, in 896, after which Caliph al-Mu'tadid re-asserted direct control over the border regions. In 946/7, Tarsus recognized the overlordship of the Hamdanid emir Sayf al-Dawla of Aleppo, who had become the new master of northern Syria and of the Byzantine borderlands. Facing a resurgent Byzantium, he was able to stem the Byzantine advance for a while, but in 965, the Byzantine emperor Nikephoros II Phokas captured the city and the rest of Cilicia, ending Muslim rule there.

List of governors

References

Sources
 
 
 
 

 
Tarsus
Medieval Islamic world-related lists